Edward and Frans Van Raemdonck were two siblings killed while serving in the Belgian Army in World War I whose story subsequently became prominent within the popular memory of the conflict in post-war Flanders.

Born in Temse in East Flanders in 1895 and 1897 respectively, Edward and Frans volunteered for service in the Belgian Army at the time of the German invasion of Belgium in August 1914 and were serving together in the 6th Company of the 24th Line Regiment (24. Linieregiment) when they were killed in an attack on the hamlet of Stampkot, near , on the Yser Front in the night of 25–26 March 1917, aged 21 and 19 respectively. 

In the aftermath of the conflict, the deaths of the "Brothers Van Raemdonck" (Gebroeders Van Raemdonck) became part of Flemish popular mythology as a result of its symbolism of brotherly love and self-sacrifice. Their flamingant views and the supposed indifference to their fate among their French-speaking officers meant that it became increasingly associated with the Flemish Movement in post-war Belgium.  Their fate was widely commemorated in monuments over following years and the brothers were symbolically reburied at the Yser Towers (IJzertoren) in 1932 and was an important part of the annual Yser Pilgrimage (IJzerbedevaart).

References

Further reading

External links
"In elkaars armen gestorven", de broers Van Raemdonck at VRT
Edward and Frans Van Raemdonck at the Nieuwe Encyclopedie van de Vlaamse Beweging.

1917 deaths
Belgian military personnel killed in World War I
Flemish nationalists
Flemish Movement
Cultural history of World War I
People from Temse
World War I memorials in Belgium
Belgian Army personnel of World War I